Yeh Hum Naheen (say no to terrorism. ﻳﻪ ﮨﻢ ﻧﹷﮭﹻﮟ, English translation meaning "This is NOT us") is a movement started against terrorism across the world. Yeh Hum Naheen was organized by an NGO headed by producer and media consultant Waseem Mahmood, and has brought together a musical movement featuring the voices of many well-known Pakistani singers and vocalists.

The movement features the vocal talents of Haroon, Hadiqa Kiyani, Ali Haider, Shafqat Amanat Ali, Ali Zafar, Strings, Deeyah, and Shuja Haider. They all come together in a song written by Ali Moeen. The music is composed by Shuja Haider with additional production and mastering of the song done by Grammy award-winning producer Darin Prindle.

The message
The song stands up against terrorism and tells the world that the Pakistani people are against terrorism and reject it. The message of the song is peace and not to prejudge and discriminate against the majority of the Muslim community which have nothing to do with terrorism. People from all over the world are continuously joining this organisation, supporting, and expanding it.

It is a message of reconciliation, a message of peace and a song uniting Muslims all across the world. The image of Muslims has been hijacked by those using Islam to justify acts of torture, terrorism, and Honour Killings. Islam is a religion of peace, the song is a defiant call from all Muslims standing up and declaring 'This is Not Us' (Yeh Hum Naheen). 63 million have signed up.

The video 

The power of the song is reinforced through the video, the final edit posted on YouTube shows Pakistani people of all professions, young and old, reciting the lyrics, re-iterating that 'This is not us'. The underlining message, say no to terrorism. However it applies not just to the Pakistani people but all Muslims.

Release dates

The single has been released in the East and has topped charts in Pakistan and India. Yeh Hum Naheen has now arrived in the UK, where it will be made available for download on 16 July 2007 from all single providers including iTunes, HMV, Napster, and many others.

External links
Official webpage
Yeh Hum Naheem music video
Official MySpace page
Yeh Hum Naheem Fan centre
Teeth maestro blog post

Islamic music
Pakistani music
Terrorism in Pakistan